The Province of Catania was a province in the autonomous island region of Sicily in southern Italy. Its capital was the city of Catania.

Historically known also as Val di Catania, it included until 1927 a large part of the Province of Enna.

It was replaced by the Metropolitan City of Catania starting from 4 August 2015.

History 
The Province of Catania was founded by Greeks, in 729 B.C. It was conquered by the Roman, in the First Punic War, in 263 BC. It had experienced many volcanic eruptions from the Mount Etna, of which the first eruption was recorded in 475 BC. It was hit by a devastating earthquake in 1169, which caused an estimated death toll of about 15,000 people in the city of Catania alone. In 1669, it was also affected by the 1669 Etna eruption. It was hit by another earthquake in 1693, which resulted in the death of about 12,000 people (63% population at the time).

Geography 
The province of Catania was one of nine provinces in the island of Sicily which is the largest island in the Mediterranean Sea. It met the Ionian Sea at the north-east. The Province of Caltanissetta and the Province of Enna lay to the west, the Province of Ragusa and the Province of Siracusa lay to the south, and the Province of Messina lay to the north. It also had the largest active volcano of Europe, Mount Etna. The provincial capital and largest commune was the city of Catania.

Subdivisions 
There were 58 comunes (Italian: comuni) in the province , see Comunes of the Province of Catania.

See also
 
 Metropolitan City of Catania

Notes and references

Notes

References

 
Catania